Randall Graves (March 19, 1792 Ashfield, then in Hampshire Co., now in Franklin County, Massachusetts - December 10, 1831) was an American politician from New York

Life
He was the son of Randall Graves (1760–1831) and Lydia (Coolidge) Graves (b. 1760). On March 19, 1816, he married Betsey Butler (1798–1849), and they had five children.

He was a member of the New York State Assembly (Steuben Co.) in 1829.

Sources
The New York Civil List compiled by Franklin Benjamin Hough (pages 208 and 277; Weed, Parsons and Co., 1858)
The New York Annual Register, for 1830 by Edwin Williams (pg. 96)
Randall Graves (1792-1831) at Ancestry.com
Graves genealogy at Family Tree Maker

1792 births
1831 deaths
People from Ashfield, Massachusetts
People from Steuben County, New York
Members of the New York State Assembly
19th-century American politicians